Gerald Roper (born November 7, 1959 in Vancouver, British Columbia) is a former professional Canadian football offensive lineman who played eleven seasons in the Canadian Football League for two different teams. He was a part of the BC Lions Grey Cup victory in 1985.

External links

1959 births
Living people
Players of Canadian football from British Columbia
Canadian football offensive linemen
Arizona Wildcats football players
BC Lions players
Ottawa Rough Riders players
Canadian football people from Vancouver